Kathleen Ann Blatz (born July 22, 1954) is a former Minnesota judge and legislator. She served as the interim chair of the Minnesota Sports Facilities Authority, which governs the U.S. Bank Stadium.

Early life and education
Blatz was born in Minneapolis to Kay and Jerome Blatz. She attended high school at the Academy of Holy Angels in Richfield, Minnesota, and received her B.A. summa cum laude from the University of Notre Dame. Blatz received degrees from the University of Minnesota Law School and the University of Minnesota School of Social Work.

Career
Blatz served in the Minnesota House of Representatives from 1979 to 1994. She was appointed a Hennepin County district court judge in 1994, an associate justice of the Minnesota Supreme Court on November 1, 1996, and Chief Justice on January 29, 1998. She retired from the court on January 10, 2006, and was succeeded as Chief Justice by Russell A. Anderson.

Personal life
Blatz is the daughter of the late Mary Kathleen "Kaye" McMahon Blatz (1926-1996) and Jerome Blatz (1923-2009). She was the second of nine children.

On June 2, 1984, in Hennepin County, she married Thomas Roger Berkelman (b. 1949), a Minnesota State Legislator from 1977 to 1983. He was previously divorced with one daughter, Lindsey Ann Berkelman. Together, Kathleen and Tom have three sons: Hunter Blatz Berkelman (b. 1986), Carter Blatz Berkelman (b. 1988), and Maxwell Blatz "Max" Berkelman (b. 1992). They divorced around 2000.

She married Wheelock Whitney Jr., a businessman and politician, in 2005. He died in 2016.

References

1954 births
Living people
Chief Justices of the Minnesota Supreme Court
Lawyers from Minneapolis
Republican Party members of the Minnesota House of Representatives
Minnesota state court judges
Politicians from Minneapolis
University of Minnesota Law School alumni
University of Notre Dame alumni
Whitney family
Women chief justices of state supreme courts in the United States
Women state legislators in Minnesota
20th-century American women judges
20th-century American judges
21st-century American women judges
21st-century American judges